Local elections in Navotas took place on May 9, 2022, within the Philippine general election. The voters elected for the mayor, vice mayor, one congressman, and the councilors – six in each of the city's two districts.

Background
Incumbent Representative John Rey Tiangco will run for mayor, switching positions with his brother, former congressman and incumbent mayor Toby Tiangco. He will be challenged by Raymond "RC" Cruz and Mario Camacho. 

Incumbent vice-mayor Clint Geronimo is term-limited and will run for a seat in City Council for 2nd District. Councilor Tito Sanchez will run in his place. His opponents are Rico de Guzman and Fredie Maiquez.

Mayor Toby Tiangco will run for district representative against former vice mayor Lutgardo Cruz.

Opinion polling

For Mayor

Candidates

Administration coalition

Primary opposition coalition

Independent candidates

Results
Incumbents are represented in italics.

Mayoral election
Incumbent Mayor Toby Tiangco is running for congressman. His brother, incumbent Representative John Rey Tiangco, is his party's nominee.

Vice mayoral election 
Incumbent Vice Mayor Clint Geronimo is term-limited and will run for city councilor in 2nd District. His party nominated 2nd District Councilor Tito Sanchez.

Congressional election
Incumbent Representative John Rey Tiangco is running for Mayor. His brother, incumbent Mayor Toby Tiangco, is his party's nominee.

City council elections

1st District

|-
| colspan="5" style="background:black;"|

2nd District

|-
| colspan="5" style="background:black;"|

References

2022 Philippine local elections
Elections in Navotas
May 2022 events in the Philippines
2022 elections in Metro Manila